Europe '72 Volume 2 is a live album by the rock band the Grateful Dead. It is a two-CD set which features 20 tracks from the band's Spring 1972 tour of Europe. As such, it represents a belated sequel to the band's original three-LP 1972 release, Europe '72. Around the time of the production of the massive Europe '72: The Complete Recordings box set in 2011, Grateful Dead archivist David Lemieux was charged with the task of developing this follow-up compilation, nearly four decades later, without repeating any of the songs that appeared on Europe '72. As with the box set, all of the music for this CD was remastered from the original 16-track tapes and encoded with HDCD specifications. The artwork for the release is by Stanley Mouse, who, along with his late partner, Alton Kelley, created the recognizable images for the original release.

Critical reception

On Allmusic, Richie Unterberger wrote, "The triple-live album Europe '72 is an iconic record not just to Deadheads, but to almost anyone who was around Grateful Dead fans or going to college in the subsequent decade, so often was it blasted out of dorm windows. Almost 40 years later, the double-CD Europe '72, Vol. 2 has about two and a half more hours of performances from the Dead's spring 1972 tour....  [The] 20 songs were deliberately selected to avoid duplicating any songs on the first Europe '72. That does mean some Dead standards featured on the original triple-LP are absent... But this installment is hardly short on familiar Dead numbers... There are also some relatively little-heard originals...  Fans of their spaciest psychedelic excursions should be sated by the nearly hourlong jam on "Dark Star" and "The Other One" that opens disc two, though that might test the tolerance of less committed Deadheads. The set features good sound and the kind of loose performances that Grateful Dead fans treasure in live recordings..."

On Glide Magazine, Doug Collette said, "Carefully selected by archivist David Lemieux from various tour stops on the Grateful Dead's first trip abroad, this package is deliberately conceived as a companion piece to the original Europe 72. As such, Volume 2 functions brilliantly as a complement to that seminal inclusion in the Grateful Dead discography. Instead of the tightly structured material that dominated the triple album (on its release designed to fulfill the band's commitment to Warner Bros Records so they could start their own label), this two CD release is filled with cover songs like "Me & My Uncle" and original material that by and large lends itself to improvisation, such as the nearly thirty-minute set of segues from "Dark Star" to "Drums" and into "The Other One.""

Writing on JamBands.com, John Patrick Gatta said, "For the cash-strapped [i.e. those who can not afford to buy Europe '72: The Complete Recordings] there's this two-CD set, Europe '72 Volume 2, a worthy successor to the legendary Europe '72 triple vinyl album. It compiles 20 tracks from seven different locales with updated cover art by Stanley Mouse of the Ice Cream Kid.... Much of disc one becomes a tribute to Ron "Pigpen" McKernan... On disc two the musical explorations arrive.... [Disc two] draws on nearly all elements of the Dead's range with never a dull moment to be found. It should also be pointed out that both discs sound amazing! One expects good things from the folks at Grateful Dead Productions but the clarity of these tapes is really a treasure. Even if you were never there, you can still feel as if you're reliving the moment."

Track listing

Recording dates
The tracks have been taken from the following shows:

April 7, 1972 at Wembley Empire Pool, London, England:
"Me and My Uncle"
"Not Fade Away" >
"Goin' Down The Road Feeling Bad" >
"Not Fade Away"
April 14, 1972 at Tivoli Concert Hall, Copenhagen, Denmark:
"Bertha"
"Chinatown Shuffle"
"Loser"
"Black-Throated Wind"
April 17, 1972 at Tivoli Concert Hall, Copenhagen, Denmark:
"Big Railroad Blues"
April 26, 1972 at Jahrhundert Hall, Frankfurt, West Germany:
"Dire Wolf"
"Good Lovin'"
May 3, 1972 at Olympia Theatre, Paris, France:
"Sugaree"
"Greatest Story Ever Told"
May 4, 1972 at Olympia Theatre, Paris, France:
"Next Time You See Me"
"Deal"
May 7, 1972 at Bickershaw Festival, Wigan, England:
"Dark Star" >
"Drums" >
"The Other One"
May 16, 1972 at Theatre Hall, Luxembourg, Luxembourg:
"Beat It On Down The Line"
May 24, 1972 at Strand Lyceum, London, England:
"Playing In The Band"
May 26, 1972 at Strand Lyceum, London, England:
"Sing Me Back Home"

Personnel

Grateful Dead
Jerry Garcia – lead guitar, vocals
Donna Jean Godchaux – vocals
Keith Godchaux – piano
Bill Kreutzmann – drums
Phil Lesh – electric bass, vocals
Ron "Pigpen" McKernan – organ, harmonica, percussion, vocals
Bob Weir – rhythm guitar, vocals
Robert Hunter – songwriter

Production
Produced for release by David Lemieux
Executive producer: Mark Pinkus
Mixed by Jeffrey Norman at Prairie Sun Recording, Cotati, CA
CD mastering by David Glasser, Airshow Mastering, Boulder, CO
Recording by Betty Cantor, Janet Furman, Bob Matthews, Rosie, Wizard
Cover artwork by Stanley Mouse
Package design by Steve Vance

References

Grateful Dead live albums
2011 live albums
Rhino Entertainment live albums